Addington was a federal electoral district in Ontario, Canada, that was represented in the House of Commons of Canada from 1867 to 1904. The electoral district was created in the British North America Act of 1867.

The County of Addington consisted of the Townships of Camden, Portland, Sheffield, Hinchinbrooke, Kaladar, Kennebec, Olden, Oso, Angelsea, Barrie, Clarendon, Palmerston, Effingham, Abinger, Miller, Canonto, Denbigh, Loughborough, and Bedford.

In 1882, the township of Ashby was added to the riding.

The electoral district was abolished in 1904 when it was merged into Lennox and Addington riding.

Members of Parliament

This riding has elected the following Member of Parliament:

Election results

On Mr. Shibley being unseated, on petition, 21 September 1874:

On Mr. Bell's death, 5 July 1901:

See also
 Past Canadian electoral districts

References

External links
Riding history from the Library of Parliament

Former federal electoral districts of Ontario
Lennox and Addington County